The 15th Pan American Games were held in Rio de Janeiro, Brazil from 13 July to 29 July 2007.

Medals

Gold

Men's Flyweight (– 51 kg): McWilliams Arroyo

Men's Team Competition: Rafael Morales, Reinaldo Oquendo, Tommy Ramos, Luis Rivera, Alexander Colón, and Luis Velázquez 
Men's Pommel Horse: Luis Rivera

Silver

Men's Team Competition: Puerto Rico national basketball team

Women's Doubles: Michelle Ayala and Yoselin León

Men's Featherweight (– 57 kg): Abner Cotto 
Men's Light Welterweight (– 64 kg): Jonathan González

Women's Trap: Deborah Feliciano

Women's 50m Freestyle: Vanessa Garcia

Bronze

Men's Light Flyweight (– 48 kg): Carlos Ortíz
Men's Lightweight (– 60 kg): José Pedraza

Men's Parallel Bars: Luis Velázquez
Men's Pommel Horse: Alexander Colón
Men's Vault: Luis Rivera

Mixed Hobie Cat 16: Enrique Figueroa and Carla Malatrasi

Men's Double Trap: Lucas Bennazar

Women's 100m Freestyle: Vanessa Garcia

Women's Flyweight (– 49 kg): Zoraida Santiago Gaston
Women's Middleweight (– 67 kg): Asunción Ocasio

Men's Freestyle (– 66 kg): Pedro Soto
Women's Freestyle (– 63 kg): Mabel Fonseca

Results by event

Basketball

Men's team competition
Team roster
Peter John Ramos
José Juan Barea
Ansel Guzmán
Miguel Berdiel 
Joel Martin Jones 
Alejandro Carmona 
Gabriel Colon  
Ricardo Sanchez 
Angelo Reyes
Héctor Velenzuela
Carmelo Lee
Manuel Narvaez
Head coach: Manuel Cintron Vega

Triathlon

Men's Competition
Edgardo Vélez Rivera
 2:00:03.05 — 25th place

Women's Competition
Melissa Ríos la Luz
 2:09:01.49 — 21st place

See also

Puerto Rico at the 2006 Central American and Caribbean Games
Puerto Rico at the 2008 Summer Olympics
Puerto Rico at the 2010 Central American and Caribbean Games

References

External links
Rio 2007 Official website

Nations at the 2007 Pan American Games
P
2007